Dorian Armand Scott (born 1 February 1982 in East Orange, New Jersey, United States) is a Jamaican shot putter.

He set a national record of 20.34 m to win at the 2006 Central American and Caribbean Games.

His personal best is 21.45 meters, achieved in March 2008 in Tallahassee, Florida. This was a Jamaican record before O'Dayne Richards broke it at the 2015 Pan American Games with a throw of 21.69.

Scott attended Seton Hall Preparatory School in West Orange, New Jersey and Florida State University in Tallahassee, Florida.

Achievements

References
 
 

1982 births
Living people
Jamaican male shot putters
Athletes (track and field) at the 2008 Summer Olympics
Athletes (track and field) at the 2012 Summer Olympics
Olympic athletes of Jamaica
Jamaican sportspeople in doping cases
Athletes (track and field) at the 2006 Commonwealth Games
Athletes (track and field) at the 2010 Commonwealth Games
Athletes (track and field) at the 2003 Pan American Games
Athletes (track and field) at the 2007 Pan American Games
Florida State University alumni
Seton Hall Preparatory School alumni
Doping cases in athletics
Commonwealth Games medallists in athletics
Commonwealth Games silver medallists for Jamaica
Pan American Games medalists in athletics (track and field)
Pan American Games silver medalists for Jamaica
Central American and Caribbean Games gold medalists for Jamaica
Competitors at the 2010 Central American and Caribbean Games
Central American and Caribbean Games medalists in athletics
Medalists at the 2007 Pan American Games
Medallists at the 2006 Commonwealth Games
Medallists at the 2010 Commonwealth Games